The football tournament at the 2013 East Asian Games was the sixth edition of East Asian Games football tournament. It was held in Tianjin, China from 6 October to 14, 2013.

The men's football games required the age of players should be under 23. No requirement for women's.

The matches were played at Tianjin, China, from 6 to 14 October 2013 (all times UTC+8:00).

Men's tournament

Women's tournament

References 

2013
2013 in Chinese football
football
2013
2013 in Asian football
2013–14 in Hong Kong football
2013 in North Korean football
2013 in South Korean football
2013 in Taiwanese football
2013 in Japanese football
2013 in women's association football